The Gander River is a river in eastern Newfoundland, Canada. It is 110 miles (177 km) long and originates at Partridgeberry Hill, south of Grand Falls-Windsor. The river then flows northeast to Gander Lake and on to Gander Bay on the Atlantic Ocean.

See also
List of rivers of Newfoundland and Labrador

External links
Gander River, The Columbia Gazetteer of North America
Gander River Management Association
Gander River Protected Area, C.N.L.R. 765/96
Gander River Protected Area Order, C.N.L.R. 766/96
Cabot Lodge on the Gander River

Rivers of Newfoundland and Labrador